M. vulgaris may refer to:
 Monograptus vulgaris, a graptolite present in the Ludlow Group
 Mycena vulgaris, a saprotrophic mushroom species in the genus Mycena

See also
 Vulgaris (disambiguation)